John Andrews (born February 5, 1952), is a former professional tennis player from the United States.

Andrews achieved a career-high singles ranking of world No. 64 in June 1975 after reaching the quarterfinals of the French Open. He won one ATP doubles title in 1976 partnering Colin Dibley.

Grand Prix, WCT, and Grand Slam finals

Doubles (1 titles, 2 runner-ups)

External links
 
 

1952 births
Living people
American male tennis players
Tennis players from Houston